Cello is a solo album by cellist David Darling recorded in 1991 and 1992 and released on the ECM label.

Reception
The Allmusic review by Ron Wynn awarded the album 3 stars stating "Superior cello playing by David Darling, a brilliant stylist who's not strictly, or even mainly, a jazz player. But he's an improviser, and his bowed and plucked solos are often astonishing in their clarity, depth, speed, and construction. He's also benefited by ECM's always-excellent production and mastering".

Track listing
All compositions by David Darling except as indicated
 "Darkwood I" - 2:21   
 "No Place Nowhere" (David Darling, Manfred Eicher) - 4:39   
 "Fables" - 5:04   
 "Darkwood II" - 1:19   
 "Lament" - 2:50   
 "Two or Three Things (For Jean-Luc Godard)" (Darling, Eicher) - 4:43   
 "Indiana Indian" - 3:24   
 "Totem" - 2:13   
 "Psalm" - 2:23   
 "Choral" - 4:05   
 "The Bell" - 2:39   
 "In November" - 4:28   
 "Darkwood III" - 3:19  
Recorded at Rainbow Studio on Oslo, Norway in November 1991 and January 1992

Personnel
David Darling - cello, 8-string electric cello

References

ECM Records albums
David Darling (musician) albums
Albums produced by Manfred Eicher
1992 albums